Sir Nicholas Nigel Green (born 15 October 1958), styled The Rt Hon. Lord Justice Green, is a judge of the Court of Appeal of England and Wales.

He was educated at King Edward VI Camp Hill School for Boys, the University of Leicester (LLB, 1980), the University of Toronto (LLM, 1981) and the University of Southampton (PhD, 1985).

He was called to the bar at Inner Temple in 1986. He was appointed a judge of the High Court of Justice (Queen's Bench Division) in 2013, and was then awarded the customary knighthood in the 2014 Special Honours. In 2018, he was promoted to the Court of Appeal and received the customary appointment to the Privy Council of the United Kingdom in the same year.

References

1958 births
Living people
People educated at King Edward VI Camp Hill School for Boys
Alumni of the University of Leicester
University of Toronto alumni
Alumni of the University of Southampton
Members of the Inner Temple
Queen's Bench Division judges
Knights Bachelor
Lords Justices of Appeal
Members of the Privy Council of the United Kingdom